This article refers to crime in the U.S. state of Arizona.

Statistics

Capital punishment laws

Capital punishment is applied in Arizona. In most circumstances, the method used is lethal injection. Inmates sentenced to death for murders committed prior to November 23, 1992 may choose lethal gas.

See also 
 List of people executed in Arizona

References